Shpejtim Arifi (born 3 May 1979) is a former professional footballer who played as a forward or winger.

Career
Arifi was born in Pristina, SFR Yugoslavia. He played for FSV Oggersheim in 2008.

Arifi signed for the Iranian club Payam Khorasan at the end of the 2007–08 Iranian Pro League season. He was a regular player in 2008–09 for Payam and was one of the top scorers of the league. He moved to Persepolis in summer 2009. He appeared in 32 league matches for the club.

Honours
SSV Reutlingen
Oberliga Baden-Württemberg: 2005–06

Persepolis
Hazfi Cup: 2009–10, 2010–11

Payam
Azadegan League: 2007–08

References

External links
 
 PersianLeague Profile
 ISNA
 fsv-lu-oggersheim
 
 statistik-klein

1979 births
Living people
Sportspeople from Pristina
Kosovan emigrants to Germany
Association football wingers
Association football forwards
German footballers
Kosovan footballers
VfR Mannheim players
SV Sandhausen players
SSV Reutlingen 05 players
FSV Oggersheim players
Payam Mashhad players
Persepolis F.C. players
Tractor S.C. players
SVN Zweibrücken players
Borussia Neunkirchen players
Persian Gulf Pro League players
Kosovan expatriate footballers
Expatriate footballers in Germany
Kosovan expatriate sportspeople in Germany
Expatriate footballers in Iran
Kosovan expatriate sportspeople in Iran
German expatriate footballers
German expatriate sportspeople in Iran